The finals stages of the 2010 Copa Sudamericana de Clubes are the Round of 16, Quarterfinals, Semifinals, and Finals. Teams from the Round of 16 onwards were seeded depending on which Second Stage tie they win (i.e. the winner of Match O1 has the 1 seed).

Bracket

Note: The bracket was adjusted according to the rules of the tournament so that the two Brazilian teams would face each other in the semifinals.

Round of 16

|-

|}

Match C1

San José 3–3 Newell's Old Boys on points. Newell's Old Boys advanced on goal difference.

Match C2

Independiente 3–3 Defensor Sporting on points. Independiente advanced on goal difference.

Match C3

Peñarol 3–3 Goiás on points. Goiás advanced on away goals.

Match C4

Palmeiras advanced on points 6–0.

Match C5

Santa Fe 3–3 Atlético Mineiro on points. Atlético Mineiro advanced on goal difference.

Match C6

Avaí 3–3 Emelec on points. Avaí advanced on goal difference.

Match C7

Deportes Tolima 3–3 Banfield on points. Deportes Tolima advanced on goal difference.

Match C8

LDU Quito 3–3 Unión San Felipe on points. LDU Quito advanced on goal difference.

Quarterfinals

|-

|}

Match S1

LDU Quito advanced on points 4–1.

Match S2

Note: The second leg was played at a neutral venue since Independiente received a one-match stadium ban after crowd trouble at their home ground during their Round of 16 second leg against Defensor Sporting.

Independiente 2–2 Deportes Tolima on points. Independiente advanced on away goals.

Match S3

Goiás advanced on points 4–1.

Match S4

Palmeiras advanced on points 4–1.

Semifinals

|-

|}

Match F1

Independiente 3–3 LDU Quito on points. Independiente advanced on away goals.

Match F2

Palmeiras 3–3 Goiás on points. Goiás advanced on away goals.

Finals

Note: In the final, the away goals rule would not be applied, and extra time would be played if necessary.

Independiente 3–3 Goiás on points. Independiente won on penalties.

References

External links
Copa Nissan Sudamericana 2010 

Final stages